Miles Allinson (born 1981) is an Australian writer.

Biography
Allinson studied creative arts and writing at the University of Melbourne and RMIT University. As well as writing, he works as a bookseller.

Allinson’s first book, Fever of Animals won the Victorian Premier’s Unpublished Manuscript Award in 2014. His second book, In Moonland won The Age’s Fiction Book of the Year Award in 2022.

Bibliography
 Fever of Animals, Scribe, 2015. 
 In Moonland, Scribe, 2021.

References 

Living people
21st-century Australian novelists
1981 births